Curtis Cress (born 11 August 1952), known by his stage name Curt Cress, is a German musician, singer and songwriter.

Life and work 

Curt Cress began his career in 1965 in Hanau with the band Load. Later also in Hanau he played with the bands Inspiration Six and most recently in 1969 Orange Peel, which was officially disbanded again the very next year, but comes together for occasional appearances. He has taken part in about 12,000 published recordings sold on at least 400 million records. He worked as a member of several bands including Klaus Doldinger's Passport, Atlantis, Spliff, Milli Vanilli and Snowball, Curt Cress Clan, and as a guest on numerous studio recordings and live performances with German and international artists, e.g. Falco, Peter Maffay, Rick Springfield, Saga and Tina Turner. In 1977, he replaced original drummer and cofounder Hans Bathelt in the german band Triumvirat, for their album Pompeii, but because of temporary legal quarrels between the keyboardist Hans-Jürgen Fritz and the drummer Hans Bathelt, concerning the name of the group, it was presented as New Triumvirat Presents Pompeii.

Cress is also known as a producer, most notably for Uwe Ochsenknecht, Claudia Cane, Heiner Pudelko, Nena, Nina Hagen and the Royal Philharmonic Orchestra. He continued to work as a studio musician, as for Boney M., Hubert Kah, Michael Cretu, Scorpions, Alphaville, BAP, Inga and Annette Humpe, Peter Cornelius, Marianne Rosenberg, Stefan Waggershausen, Udo Lindenberg, Meat Loaf and Freddie Mercury (Mr. Bad Guy).

Cress also made himself a name as a TV and film music composer. He composed the music for the series SK Kölsch, The Red Mile, HeliCops – Einsatz über Berlin and for the telenovelas Bianca – Wege zum Glück and Julia – Wege zum Glück. Cress is one of the composer's music scene for the series Love in Berlin. He also worked for Tatort and composed, among others, the theme songs of the ARD sports show and Wetten, dass..?. For the feature film Bandits Cress was hired as playback drummer. Since 2009 he records along with Chris Weller and Manuel Mayer for the music of the ZDF telenovela  Alisa - Follow your heart.

Since 2006, Cress has been a professor at the Hamburg Hochschule für Musik und Theater;  he has taught there since 2004.

His company CC HOLDING GmbH produces media products for music, film, and television. The holding company has F.A.M.E. company Recordings Publishing GmbH, F.A.M.E. Artist Recordings GmbH, CRESS PUBLISHING GmbH, and pilot Tonstudio GmbH.

Personal life 

Curt Cress is married and has three children.

Discography

Solo work
1975: Curt Cress Clan (LP)
1983: Avanti (LP: WEA 24.0133; CD: WEA 240 133-2)
1987: Sing (LP)
1992: Bäng (CD)
1998: Trip (CD: WEA [Warner] 3984-21825-2)

With other musicians
1972: Atlantis – Atlantis
1973:  – Arbeit macht frei (LP: Bluff Records, BF 1010)
1973: Passport – Hand Made 
1973: Passport – Looking Thru
1974: Doldinger Jubilee Concert
1975: Passport – Cross-Collateral
1976: Lucifer’s Friend – Mind Exploding (LP: Vertigo)
1977: Passport – Iguaçu
1977: New Triumvirat – New Triumvirat Presents Pompeii
1978: Snowball – Defroster
1979: Snowball – Cold Heat
1979: Jack-Knife – I Wish You Would
1980: Snowball – Follow the White Line
1981: Mike Batt – Six Days In Berlin
1982: Passport – earthborn
1983: Peter Schilling - Error in the System
1984: Alphaville - Forever Young
1984: Skiantos - Ti Spalmo la Crema
1985: Freddie Mercury - Mr. Bad Guy
1985: Far Corporation - Division One
1985: Passport - Running in Real Time
1986: Meat Loaf - Blind Before I Stop
1987: Saga - Wildest Dreams
1988: [[Rock of Life|Rick Springfield - Rock Of Life']]'
1988–1990: Milli Vanilli
1989: Saga - The Beginner's Guide to Throwing Shapes1989: Elio e Le Storie Tese - Elio Samaga Hukapan Kariyana Turu1989: Elio e Le Storie Tese - The Los Sri Lanka Parakramabahu Brothers Featuring Elio e le Storie Tese1990: Alex Gunia – Alex Gunia’s Groove Cut1990–1992: The Real Milli Vanilli
1996: Scorpions – Pure Instinct1998: John Wetton and Richard Palmer-James – Monkey Business 1972–1997Awards
 15 times Drummer of the Year (journal) 
 Record Prize of the German Phono Academy 
 Gold records, and A. for  Bandits ,  BAP ,  Münchener Freiheit Literature
 Martin Kunzler: Jazz Encyclopedia''. Rowohlt, Reinbek 2002

References

External links
 
 
 Interview auf sueddeutsche.de
 Interview auf comeunited.com
 Prof. Curt Cress beim Popkurs Hamburg
 Curt Cress zum Professor ernannt - abendblatt.de
 Offizielle Website von Curt Cress Plattenfirma "Fame Recordings"
 Interview mit Curt Cress vom 28. Juni 2011 aus der Sendung Mensch Theile (Podcast)
 Podcast des Interviews Eins zu Eins auf Bayern 2

1952 births
Living people
German drummers
Male drummers
German male musicians
German film score composers
German male composers
Male film score composers